Euphaedra grilloti is a butterfly in the family Nymphalidae. It is found in the north-eastern part of the Democratic Republic of the Congo and the Republic of the Congo (Mbamu island).

References

Butterflies described in 1983
grilloti